Adam Thomas (born 1 April 1992) is a New Zealand footballer who plays as a defender for Irish club Galway United, on loan from Shelbourne. He represented New Zealand at the 2012 Summer Olympics

Club career
Thomas joined Team Wellington in January 2013. He transferred mid-season from Waikato FC where he had been stood down for giving them late notice of his intentions to move to Wellington. Thomas missed 6 years of his career between 2013 and 2018 due to several injuries which required surgery.

On 15 February 2022, he signed for League of Ireland Premier Division club Shelbourne under new manager Damien Duff. On 28 July 2022, Thomas signed for League of Ireland First Division side Galway United until the end of the season.

References

External links

NZ Football profile

1992 births
Living people
New Zealand association footballers
Olympic association footballers of New Zealand
Footballers at the 2012 Summer Olympics
Team Wellington players
Auckland City FC players
Waikato FC players
Shelbourne F.C. players
Galway United F.C. players
League of Ireland players
Expatriate association footballers in the Republic of Ireland
Association football defenders
New Zealand Football Championship players